The 9th New Brunswick Legislative Assembly represented New Brunswick between February 14, 1828, and 1830.

The assembly sat at the pleasure of the Governor of New Brunswick Howard Douglas.

Richard Simonds was chosen as speaker for the house. He was replaced by his brother Charles in 1829.

History

Members 

Notes:

References 
Journal of the House of Assembly of the province of New-Brunswick, from Thursday the 14th day of February, to Saturday the 5th day of April, 1828 (1828)

09
1830 in Canada
1828 in Canada
1829 in Canada
1827 establishments in New Brunswick
1830 disestablishments in New Brunswick